The 1932 United States Senate election in Vermont took place on November 8, 1932. Republican Porter H. Dale successfully ran for re-election to another term in the United States Senate, defeating Democratic candidate Fred C. Martin. Dale died in October 1933, vacating the seat until a special election was held in January 1934.

Republican primary

Results

Democratic primary

Results

General election

Results

See also 
 United States Senate elections, 1932 and 1933

References

Vermont
1932
United States Senate